Daniel Meaney (born 1996) is an Irish hurler who plays as a midfielder for club side Blackrock and at inter-county level with the Cork senior hurling team.

Honours

Blackrock
Cork Premier Senior Hurling Championship: 2020

References

1996 births
Living people
CIT hurlers
Blackrock National Hurling Club hurlers
Cork inter-county hurlers